Claes Berglund is a Swedish ski-orienteering competitor and world champion. He won a gold medal in the classic distance at the World Ski Orienteering Championships in Batak in 1986, and he was part of the Swedish relay team, which  placed fourth.

References

Year of birth missing (living people)
Living people
Swedish orienteers
Male orienteers
Ski-orienteers
20th-century Swedish people